Elissar Zakaria Khoury (born 27 October 1972), commonly known as Elissa, is a Lebanese recording artist. She is one of Lebanon's most famous singers, and one of the best-known artists in the Arab world.

She has been among the highest-selling female Middle Eastern artists since 2005. In 2005, she became the first Lebanese singer to receive the World Music Award for Best Selling Middle Eastern Artist, an award that she received again in 2006 and 2010. She has currently sold over 30 million albums worldwide. Elissa is also one of the richest celebrities in Lebanon, with a reported estimated wealth of over $40 million. As of 2019, Elissa has over 50 million followers on social media. In 2018, Elissa appeared as a judge on The Voice: Ahla Sawt, the Arab edition of The Voice.

Early life
Elissa was born in Deir Al-Ahmar to a Lebanese father and a Syrian mother from Wadi al-Nasara. She has three brothers Ghassan, Kamil and Jihad and two sisters Norma and Rita. Elissa was raised in the Beqaa Valley with her other siblings.

She graduated from the Lebanese University with a degree in political science. Although she had a degree in politics, she was additionally interested in making music. Therefore, after graduating, she decided to pursue a professional career in show business and in music. To successfully combine her passion of politics and theatre, Elissa joined Le Théâtre de Dix-Heures, a Lebanese Theatrical Group.

Career

1992–99: Career beginnings, Studio El Fan, and debut album Baddy Doub
Elissa's musical career began in 1992, when she won the silver medal in Studio El Fan, a Lebanese music competition.

Her debut studio album, Baddy Doub (I Want to Melt Away), was released in Lebanon in late 1998 and later distributed across the Arab world by EMI Music Arabia in 1999. On the album's titular single, she collaborated with Spanish singer, Gerard Ferrer. In the same year, Elissa got her first big brand deal when shampoo brand Head & Shoulders took her on as the empowering and bold face of the company in the Middle East.

2000–2003: W'akherta Maak and Ayshalak

Elissa released her second album, W'akherta Maak (To the End with You) in September 2000. The album included the duet "Betghib Betrouh" (You Disappear, You Go), featuring Ragheb Alama. She was the only Arabic artist to perform in front of former United States President Bill Clinton at the Stars Charity show in Dubai. In that year, she won the Murex d'Or award for Best Female Artist.

Her third studio album, Ayshalak (I Live for You), was released in June 2002. For the album's titular hit single, she filmed a music video in Paris, dressed by Christian Dior. This was the first time the fashion house had worked with an Arab artist. The music video for "Ajmal Ihssas" (Best Feeling) won an Arabic Music Award for Best Video Clip in Dubai. On the same year, Elissa inaugurated Kuwait's Virgin Megastore with Sir Richard Branson. She appeared on a collaboration with Irish singer Chris de Burgh in the duet "Lebanese Nights", featured on his 2002 album Timing is Everything.

2003–06: Further recognition, Ahla Dounya and Bastanak

In December 2003, Elissa signed a four-year promotional deal with Pepsi, becoming the Middle East's brand ambassador. In January 2004, she appeared at a Pepsi press conference in London, England alongside American recording artists Beyoncé, Britney Spears and Pink. Subsequently, she shot two Pepsi advertisements with Christina Aguilera for the World Football Cup; both of which were shot in Los Angeles.

In 2004, Elissa signed with Saudi Arabian entertainment group Rotana, under which she released her fourth studio album, Ahla Dounya (The Most Beautiful World) on 19 April. The album had various singles and accompanying music videos including "Koul Youm Fee Oumri" (Every Day of My Life), "Irjaa Lilshowk" (Return to Love) and "Hobak Wajaa (Inta Lameen)" (Your Love Hurts / Who Do You Belong To?). The tracks "Koul Youm Fee Oumri", "Karibli" (Come Close to Me) and "Law Nirjaa Sawa" (If We're Together Again) were featured in Pepsi advertisements. By the end of 2004, Ahla Dounya had sold about 3.4 million copies. In 2005, Elissa became the first Lebanese artist to ever receive a World Music Award for Best Selling Artist from the Middle East. The ceremony took place in Hollywood's Kodak Theatre. In December 2005, she received the Murex d'Or for Best Lebanese Artist and Best Video Clip for "Hobak Wajaa". Despite the huge success, Elissa revealed in an interview in 2017, she felt that this album was a step back from "Ayshalak", although it is a fan favorite.

On 16 February 2006, she released her fifth studio album Bastanak (Waiting for You). The album had the hit single of the same name and "Law Taarafou" (If You Knew Him), both received accompanying music videos. Other popular songs on the album included "Kermalak" (For You), "Taa" (Come), "Fatet Sineen" (Years Went By), and "Zanbi Ana" (It's My Fault); the latter composed by Marwan Khoury. On 15 November, Elissa received her second World Music Award in a row for the sales of this album. As of 2006, Bastanak had sold 3.7 million copies.

2007–10: Ayami Bik and Tesada'a Bemeen 

Elissa's sixth studio album Ayami Bik (My Days with You) was released on 18 December 2007. Including one of Elissa's bigger hits "Betmoun" (I Owe You) as well as "Awakher Al Shita" (The End of Winter), "Ayami Bik" and "Khod Balak Alaya" (Take Care of Me). Tesada'a Bemeen (Who Do You Believe In?), her seventh studio album, was released on 26 December 2009 and included one of her signature songs "Aa Bali Habibi" (I Want to, Darling…) and titular song "Tesada'a Bemeen". Elissa garnered her third World Music Award for Tesada'a Bemeen. In November 2010, she was awarded the prize for "Best Arab Female Artist" in the Jordan Music Awards and the Big Apple Music Award for "Best Female Artist" in the Middle East a few days later. Tesada'a Bemeen received critical acclaim for its differing and darker themes and stronger vocal delivery throughout the album, including songs such as "Min Gheir Mounasba" (For No Reason), "Fi Shi Nkasar" (Something Broke) and "Eftakart" (I Remembered).

2012–15: Asaad Wahda, Halet Hob, and MBC The X Factor

Her eighth studio album, Asaad Wahda (The Happiest One), was released on 19 June 2012. The album spawned music videos for the titular song and "Teebt Mennak" (I'm Fed Up with You). The latter's video was released the following year. During the summer of 2012, Elissa released the title song for the Maa Sabk Al Esrar series. In December 2012, Elissa was chosen to be one of the judges of The X Factor Arabia; It was on the air the first four months of 2013. On 23 June 2013 Elissa received two Murex D’or awards, for the Best Lebanese Singer and Best Arabic Song for "Asaad Wahda". During the summer of 2014, Elissa released a song titled "Law" (What If), composed by Marwan Khoury.

Elissa released her ninth studio album Halet Hob (A State of Love) in July 2014. The album included covers of the songs "Awel Mara" (The Very First Time) and "Helwa Ya Baladi" (My Beautiful Country). She released the first music video of "Hob Kol Hayaty" (The Love of My Life) on 12 December 2014. Elissa returned as a judge on The X Factor for its second season on 14 March 2015. Elissa released her cover version of "Mawtini" on 29 April 2015, along with its music video. The second video from her ninth studio album was released on 14 May 2015, for "Ya Merayti" (On Mirror). The titular song was released as the final single in early 2016. The lyric video of "Halet Hob" has amassed more than 100 million views on YouTube.

2016–17: Saharna Ya Leil

Elissa released her tenth studio album Saharna Ya Leil (Keep Us Up All Night) during the summer of 2016, which included singles "Saharna Ya Leil", "Maliket El Ehsas" (Queen of Feelings) and "Aaks Elli Shayfenha" (The Opposite of What You See). Despite not being released as a single, the lyric video for "Maktooba Leek" (Destined for You) amassed over 120 million views (as of August 2019) on Rotana's official YouTube page, making it the most watched video on their channel. The following year, Elissa released a music video for "Aaks Elli Shayfenha". Directed by Angy Jammal, the video reached 3 million views during its first week of release and as of August 2019, has garnered over 60 million views on YouTube. In May 2017, Elissa announced that she is the new face of Freshlook Air Optix Colors.

In August 2017, Elissa was featured on Forbes Middle East English edition's August cover and gave a concert as part of Beirut Holidays Festival 2017. On 14 August, Elissa released a remix for the song "Ana Majnouni" (I'm Crazy) which was previously released 3 years ago. "Ana Majnouni" marked the third collaboration with her brother Camil Khoury and amassed more than half a million plays during its first 2 days of release. In early September, it was announced that Elissa will be one of the new The Voice: Ahla Sawt season 4 coaches alongside Emirati singer Ahlam, Lebanese singer Assi El Hallani, and Egyptian singer Mohamed Hamaki.

2018–present: Ila Kol Lli Bihibbouni and Sahbit Raey

On 11 July 2018, Elissa released the first lead single titled "Ila Kol Lli Bihibbouni" (To All Those Who Love Me) from her eleventh studio album of the same name. On 16 July 2018, Elissa dropped a promotional single from the album entitled "Krahni" (Want You to Hate Me), marking the fourth collaboration with her brother Camil Khoury who handled the song's arrangement. Camil additionally handled the arrangement for two more songs on the album: "Maridit Ehtimam" (Attention Seeker) and "Enta W Maii" (When You're With Me). All three songs are in the Lebanese dialect. Ila Kol Lli Bihibbouni was released on 25 July 2018. The album includes various dramatic, orchestral and emotional tracks, such as "Al Mikhfi" (Our Secret) and "Ana Wahida" (Lonely). Additionally featuring poppy songs such as "Men Inaya Di" (I'm All Yours) and also including "Wahashtouni" (How I Miss You), a cover of Warda's song of the same name.

On 7 August 2018, Elissa released the music video for "Ila Kol Lli Bihibbouni" where in the music video, Elissa disclosed her breast cancer diagnosis in late December 2017 along with her treatment and recovery. The music video went viral and amassed more than 9 million views during its first week of release.

On 10 August 2018, Elissa gave a concert as part of Beirut Holidays Festival 2018; among the attendees was Armenian entertainer Lubluba. She also gave a concert in Tunisia. In September 2018, the Lebanese Information Minister honored Elissa for her career. In October 2018, Elissa hinted at possible problems with label Rotana due to their exclusive deal with the Paris-based music streaming service Deezer, prompting the immediate removal of her entire discography from online digital services such as Anghami, Spotify and iTunes along with various Rotana-signed artists. On 22 April 2019 she released the music video for her song "Krahni".

In November 2018, Elissa announced on Twitter that she had begun work on her upcoming twelfth studio album. On 18 January 2019, Elissa performed a benefit concert in Egypt. In July, she announced a partnership with makeup artist Bassam Fattouh, releasing an eyeshadow palette titled 'The Star'. On 22 July, a promotional song for Telecom Egypt's 'WE' mobile service titled "Abl Ay Had" (Without A Limit) was released and as of August 2019, gained over 15 million views on YouTube.

On 18 August 2019, she announced her retirement from the music industry via Twitter, stating her then-upcoming twelfth studio album would be her last and describing the music industry field as "similar to the mafias." The news of her retirement shocked fans and fellow artists as #كلنااليسا (#WeAreAllElissa) began to trend on Twitter, being offered support for the singer by fans and artists alike. On 18 July 2020, she also announced her twelfth album Sahbit Raey (A Woman's Opinion) and released the lead single of the same name on 23 July. The album was followed by two singles titled "Hanghani Kaman Wi Kaman" and "Ahwet El Madi", which were released on 11 April and 25 May respectively and were later included in the track listing. An initial cover for the album/single with suggestive themes had caused controversy among audiences and had prompted Elissa's management to have it replaced with a different cover. The album was released exclusively on Deezer and Rotana's official YouTube channel during the Eid al-Adha season on 1 August. The album's final song features a French-language cover of "Mourir sur scène" by Egyptian-born Italian-French artist Dalida.

Personal life and political views

In 2014, Elissa took to social media to condemn the atrocities committed by ISIS against minorities, stating "I'm Lebanese and I'm proudly Christian, shame on such people." Elissa is an outspoken advocate of women's rights in the Middle East.

An advocate for breast cancer awareness, Elissa revealed her previously private diagnosis and defeat of an early stage of the disease with the release of her music video for "Ila Kol Elli Bihebbouni"; previously keeping it a secret from both the press and general public from her diagnosis in late 2017. The video ends with the following message: "I've recovered, I've beaten the illness and I won... Early detection of breast cancer can save your life... Don't ignore it, face it... Do it not only for yourself, but for your loved ones." Many applauded her for "breaking the taboo" of breast cancer awareness in the Middle East and therefore influenced and encouraged women to be checked for the disease. The hashtags #Elissa (اليسا#) and #To_All_Who_Love_Me (الى_كل_اللي_بيحبوني#) began to trend in Lebanon and surrounding countries in the Middle East. In October 2018, Elissa was chosen as an ambassador for a breast cancer awareness campaign in Beirut.

Elissa admitted in May Chidiac Foundation conference that she was subject of bullying for her mouth on social media, but she said, "When you achieve what I achieved in life, you can come and say whatever you want."

She is a supporter of the Lebanese Forces party and its leader Samir Geagea, backing him for the presidency before the election of Michel Aoun.

Discography

Studio albums 
 Baddy Doub (1998)
 W'akherta Maak (2000)
 Ayshalak (2002)
 Ahla Dounya (2004)
 Bastanak (2006)
 Ayami Bik (2007)
 Tesada'a Bemeen (2009)
 Asaad Wahda (2012)
 Halet Hob (2014)
 Saharna Ya Leil (2016) 
 Ila Kol Lli Bihibbouni (2018)
 Sahbit Raey (2020)

Compilations 
 Best of Elissa (2011)

EPs 
 Aghani Min Hayati (Live) (2021)

Singles and charted songs

Collaborations 
 Betghib Betrouh (with Ragheb Alama) [2000]
 Lebanese Night (ft. Chris de Burgh) [2002]
 Kount Fi Sirtak (ft. Cheb Mami) [2006]
 Jouwa El Roh (ft. Fadel Chaker) [2009]
 Wara El-Shababik (ft. Tamer Hosny) [2017]
 Efrah (ft. Tamer Hosny) [2022]
 Min Awel Dekika (ft. Saad Lamjarred) [2022]

Videography

Audio works
 Elissa - The Podcast on Anghami (2021)

References

External links 

 

1972 births
Living people
21st-century Lebanese women singers
World Music Awards winners
Rotana Records artists
Lebanese film actresses
Lebanese television actresses
Lebanese Maronites
Lebanese people of Syrian descent
People from Deir el Ahmar
20th-century Lebanese women singers
Lebanese University alumni
Universal Music Group artists
Singers who perform in Egyptian Arabic
Performers of Christian music in Arabic